Lake Vilacota (possibly from Aymara wila red / blood, quta lake, "red lake") is a lake in the region of Tacna, in Peru. More precisely, it belongs to Tarata Province, Susapaya District, along the border with the Santa Rosa District of El Collao Province in the neighboring region of Puno.

Yucamane volcano lies west of the lake. To the east of Lake Vilacota there is a smaller lake named Ancocota (possibly Aymara for "white lake"); both lakes being connected by a short river. Moreover, both lakes are the headwaters of Mauri River.

See also
 List of lakes in Peru

References

Vilacota
Vilacota